Nahapana (Kharosthi:  , ; Brahmi:  , ;), was an important ruler of the Western Kshatrapas, descendant of the Indo-Scythians, in northwestern India, who ruled during the 1st or 2nd century CE. According to one of his coins, he was the son of Bhumaka.

Name 
Nahapana's name appears on his coins in the Kharosthi form , the Brahmi form , and the Greek form , which are derived from the Saka name , which means "protector of the clan".

Period 

The exact period of Nahapana is not certain. A group of his inscriptions are dated to the years 41-46 of an unspecified era. Assuming that this era is the Shaka era (which starts in 78 CE), some scholars have assigned his reign to 119-124 CE. Others believe that the years 41-46 are his regnal years, and assign his rule to a different period. For example, Krishna Chandra Sagar assigns his reign to 24-70 CE, while R.C.C. Fynes dates it to c. 66-71 CE, and Shailendra Bhandare regards 78 CE as the last year of his reign.

Reign 
The Periplus of the Erythraean Sea mentions one Nambanus as the ruler of the area around Barigaza. This person has been identified as Nahapana by modern scholars. The text describes Nambanus as follows:

He also established the Kshatrapa coinage, in a style derived from Indo-Greek coinage. The obverse of the coins consists of the profile of the ruler, within a legend in Greek. The reverse represents a thunderbolt and an arrow, within Brahmi and Kharoshthi legends.

Nahapana is mentioned as a donator in inscriptions of numerous Buddhist caves in northern India. The Nasik and Karle inscriptions refer to Nahapana's dynastic name (Kshaharata, for "Kshatrapa") but not to his ethnicity (Saka-Pahlava), which is known from other sources.

Nahapana had a son-in-law named Ushavadata (Sanskrit: Rishabhadatta), whose inscriptions were incised in the Pandavleni Caves near Nasik. Ushavadata was son of Dinika and had married Dakshamitra, daughter of Nahapana. According to the inscriptions, Ushavadata accomplished various charities and conquests on behalf of his father-in-law. He constructed rest-houses, gardens and tanks at Bharukachchha (Bharuch), Dashapura (Mandasor in Malva), Govardhana (near Nasik) and Shorparaga (Sopara in the Thana district). He also campaigned in the north under the orders of Nahapana to rescue the Uttamabhadras who had been attacked by the Malayas (Malavas). He excavated a cave (one of the Pandavleni Caves) in the Trirashmi hill near Nasik and offered it to the Buddhist monks.

Defeat by Gautamiputra Satakarni 

Overstrikes of Nahapana's coins by the powerful Satavahana king Gautamiputra Satakarni have been found in a hoard at Jogalthambi, Nashik District. This suggests that Gautamiputra defeated Nahapana.The Nasik Cave No.3, inscription No.2 insription notes that Nahapana's     'Khakharata race' was rooted out, which means all his possible heirs might have been killed.

Earlier scholars such as James Burgess have pointed out that Gautamiputra Satakarni and Nahapana were not necessarily contemporaries, since Satakarni mentions that the areas conquered by him were ruled by Ushavadata, rather than Nahapana. According to Burgess, there might have been an interval of as much as a century between the reigns of these two kings. However, most historians now agree that Gautamiputra and Nahapana were contemporaries, and that Gautamiputra defeated Nahapana. M. K. Dhavalikar dates this event to c. 124 CE, which according to him, was the 18th regnal year of Gautamiputra. R.C.C. Fynes dates the event to sometime after 71 CE, in the same line, Shailendra Bhandare places the victory of Gautamiputra and the end of Nahapana's reign to the start of Saka era, 78 CE, in the year of Chashtana's ascension to the throne, and considers Gautamiputra's whole reign to ca. 60-85 CE.

Nahapana was founder of one of the two major Saka Satrap dynasties in north-western India, the Kshaharatas ("Satraps"); the other dynasty included the one founded by Chashtana.

Construction and dedication of Buddhist caves

The Western Satraps are known for the construction and dedication of numerous Buddhist caves in Central India, particularly in the areas of Maharashtra and Gujarat.

Karla caves

In particular, the chaitya cave complex of the Karla Caves, the largest in South Asia, was constructed and dedicated in 120 CE by Nahapana, according to several inscriptions in the cave.

An important inscription relates to Nahapana in the Great Chaitya at Karla Caves (Valukura is thought to be an ancient name for Karla Caves):

Nahapana vihara at Nasik
Parts of the Nasik Caves also were carved during the time of Nahapana, and the Junnar caves also have inscriptions of Nahapana, as well as the Manmodi Caves.

Nahapana cave in Junnar
In a Buddhist cave of the Bhimasankar group of the Manmodi Caves in Junnar, there is an inscription in three lines, of which, however, the first letters are obliterated; still it is possible make out that it was [constructed by] "Ayama, the minister of Mahakshatrapa Svami Nahapana." This inscription bears a Saka era date of year 46, which is 124 CE. The inscription is located in the fourth excavation on the eastern side of Manmodi Hill, in Cave 7. It reads:

References

Bibliography 

 
 
R.C. Senior "Indo-Scythian coins and history" Vol IV,

External links
, by Durga Prasad, with numerous references to Nahapana.
Coins of Nahapana
More coins of Nahapana
Coins with biography

Western Satraps
Periplus of the Erythraean Sea
2nd-century Indian monarchs